1824 may refer to:

The year 1824
1824 (board game)
The novel, 1824: The Arkansas War